Eve of Destruction is a 1991 American science fiction/action film. The film is about a nuclear armed prototype android named EVE gone amok while being field tested by the military in a big city. The film stars Gregory Hines as Col. Jim McQuade and Dutch actress Renée Soutendijk (in her first U.S. film) with the dual roles as the robot's creator Dr. Eve Simmons, and the robot Eve herself.

Plot
EVE VIII is a military android created to look and sound exactly like her creator, Dr. Eve Simmons. When the robot is damaged during a bank robbery, it accesses memories it was programmed with by her creator. The memories used, though, are dark and tragic ones.

The robot is also programmed as a killing machine if anyone tries to stop her mission. Colonel Jim McQuade is tasked with eliminating the unstoppable machine. With the help of Dr. Simmons, he tries to outthink the intelligent and emotional robotic doppelgänger.

Cast
 Gregory Hines as Col. Jim McQuade
 Renée Soutendijk as Dr. Eve Simmons/EVE VIII
 Kurt Fuller as Bill Schneider
 Michael Greene as General Curtis
 John M. Jackson as Peter Arnold
 Kevin McCarthy as William Simmons (uncredited)

Reception
The film received negative reviews from critics, having a 20% "rotten" score on RottenTomatoes.com. Vincent Canby gave a negative review in The New York Times, calling the film "an undistinguished, barely functional action-melodrama."

Box Office

The movie opened with $2.5 million. It finished its run with a total of $5,451,119 against a $13 million budget, making it a box-office bomb.

Home media
Eve of Destruction released on VHS on August 8, 1991, from New Line Home Video. Also, MGM Home Entertainment released Eve of Destruction on DVD on July 15, 2003.

References

External links
 
 
 

1991 films
1990s science fiction action films
American chase films
American science fiction action films
1990s chase films
Fictional cyborgs
Films about computing
Orion Pictures films
New Line Cinema films
Techno-thriller films
Interscope Communications films
Android (robot) films
Films scored by Philippe Sarde
1990s English-language films
1990s American films